Elections to the Baseball Hall of Fame for 1968 followed rules revised in June 1967, which returned the Baseball Writers' Association of America (BBWAA) to annual elections without any provision for a runoff. In the event, the BBWAA voted once by mail to select from recent major league players, and elected Joe Medwick. The Veterans Committee met in closed sessions to consider executives, managers, umpires, and earlier major league players. It selected two players, Kiki Cuyler and Goose Goslin. A formal induction ceremony was held in Cooperstown, New York, on July 22, 1968, with Commissioner of Baseball William Eckert presiding.

BBWAA election
The BBWAA was authorized to elect players active in 1948 or later, but not after 1962; the ballot included candidates from the 1967 ballot who received at least 5% of the vote but were not elected, along with selected players, chosen by a screening committee, whose last appearance was in 1962. All 10-year members of the BBWAA were eligible to vote.

Voters were instructed to cast votes for up to 10 candidates; any candidate receiving votes on at least 75% of the ballots would be honored with induction to the Hall. The ballot consisted of 48 players; a total of 283 ballots were cast, with 213 votes required for election. A total of 2,109 individual votes were cast, an average of 7.45 per ballot. 
Candidates who were eligible for the first time are indicated here with a dagger (†). The one candidate who received at least 75% of the vote and was elected is indicated in bold italics; candidates who have since been elected in subsequent elections are indicated in italics.

Joe Medwick, Arky Vaughan, Terry Moore, Frankie Crosetti and Frank McCormick were on the ballot for the final time.

Players eligible for the first time who were not included on the ballot were: Reno Bertoia, Steve Bilko, Jim Busby, Andy Carey, Bob Cerv, Harry Chiti, Billy Consolo, Dick Gernert, Joe Ginsberg, Billy Goodman, Granny Hamner, Clem Labine, Turk Lown, Hal Naragon, Bob Nieman, Danny O'Connell, Dave Philley, Sammy White, Gene Woodling, and Eddie Yost

J. G. Taylor Spink Award 
Damon Runyon (1880–1946) received the J. G. Taylor Spink Award honoring a baseball writer. The award was voted at the December 1967 meeting of the BBWAA, and included in the summer 1968 ceremonies.

References

External links
1968 Election at www.baseballhalloffame.org

Baseball Hall of Fame balloting
Hall of Fame balloting